Cèlia Sànchez-Mústich (born 9 December 1954) is a Spanish poet and writer in the Catalan language. She has lived in Sitges since 2001.

Biography
Cèlia Sànchez-Mústich undertook musical studies (piano, guitar, harmony) at the Arts of the Rhythm School and at the Liceu Conservatory in Barcelona. Part of her poems have been translated to Galician, Basque, Spanish, French, Occitan, Italian and English, and form part of several anthologies (Parlano le donne, poetesse catalane of the XXI secolo, 48 poètes Catalan pour le XXI siècle, La Traductière or the most recent Paraula encesa, by Jordi Julià and Pere Ballart, between other) and audiovisual (audiovisual File of poets of the ACEC, etc.).

She has read her poems in several places of the Catalan Countries, often in collaboration with other poets and musicians. A short film, Radio-Taxi (2012) directed by Jordi Bueno was based on one of her short stories. Also as a cultural activist, she has promoted several projects about poetry such as the poetical and musical meetings in Lailo, during five years, and the Festa de la poesia a Sitges she directs along with the poet and biochemist  since 2007.

Since then, she began to receive some attention from France such as the joint offer of Editions du Noroît (Quebec), and Myriam Solal (Paris), to publish the French version of her book On no sabem, or the invitation to take part in the Voix de la Méditerranée 2014 festival in Lodève. In autumn 2013, Myriam Solal and Editions du Noroît finally reached an agreement to publish On no sabem as Cet espace entre nous, translated by the poet and translator .

Work

Poetry
 La cendra i el miracle. Barcelona: Columna, 1989
 El lleu respir. Barcelona: Columna, 1991
 Temperatura humana. Barcelona: Columna, 1994
 Taques. Barcelona: Edicions 62, 1997
 Llum de claraboia. Lleida: Pagès, 2004
 A la taula del mig. Palma de Mallorca: Moll, 2009
 On no sabem. València: Tresiquatre, 2010
 A l'hotel, a deshora. Girona: Curbet Edicions, 2014
 La gota negra. Lleida: Pagès, 2018

Novel
 Les cambres del desig. Barcelona: Columna, 1999
 Tercer acte d'amor. Barcelona: Proa, 2002

Short stories and essay
 Diagnòstic: lluna nova. Barcelona: ICD, 1993
 Pati de butaques. Barcelona: Columna, 1996
 El tacte de l'ametlla. Barcelona: Proa, 2000
 Peret, l'ànima d'un poble. Barcelona: Edicions 62, 2005
 Il·lusionistes del futbol. Valls: Cossetània, 2007
 No. I sí. Lleida: Pagès, 2009
 Ara et diré què em passa amb les dones i tretze contes més. Barcelona: Editorial Moll, 2013.
 Els vells, aquella nosa. Barcelona: Comanegra, 2020.

Translated works
 Peret, el alma d'un pueblo to Spanish. Península, 2005.
 Le Jour J anthology in French, dins Nouvelles de Catalogne. Magellan & Cie, 
 Cet espace entre nous French version of On no sabem. Myriam Solal, Paris, and Editions du Noroît, Quebec, 2014.

Awards
 Rosa Leveroni (1990): El lleu respir 
 Don-na (1992): Diagnòstic: lluna nova
 Premi Miquel de Palol de poesia (1996): Taques  
 Premi Mercè Rodoreda de contes i narracions, de la Nit literària de Santa Llúcia (1999): El tacte de l'ametlla  
 7LLETRES (2008): NO. I SÍ 
 Premi Crítica Serra d'Or de Literatura i Assaig|Premi Crítica Serra d'Or de poesia 2010 A la taula del mig 
 Ploma d'Or de l'Ajuntament de Sitges (2010) 
 Premi Octubre Vicent Andrés Estellés de poesia 2010 On no sabem

References

External links
 AELC official website about "Cèlia Sànchez-Mústich
 Cet espace entre nous, Cèlia Sànchez-Mústich. Maison de l’Amérique Latine, Paris
 Review of 'Ara et diré que em passa amb les dones i tretze contes més ''Revista Núvol
 Quelques poèmes en français de "Cèlia Sànchez-Mústich" Festival Voix de la Mediterranée a Lodève
 "Celia Sànchez-Mústich" article al blog de Florenci Salesas sobre l'antologació a la revista Europe Revue Europe
 "Cèlia Sànchez-Mústich" Youtube channel with several interviews, presentations, clips and other videos Youtube
 tv clip from Cet espace entre nous, "Cèlia Sànchez-Mústich" Maricel TV
 "Cèlia Sànchez-Mústich"  Gran Enciclopèdia Catalana

1954 births
Catalan-language poets
Catalan-language writers
Poets from Catalonia
Living people
Spanish women poets